The Florida Strawberry Festival is an annual event taking place in Plant City, Florida. The festival lasts 11 days and generates attendance of about half a million patrons from all across Central Florida and other areas. The festival is considered one of the best in Florida and ranks among the Top 40 Fairs in North America. 

The festival is a venue for flea market-style craft and item sales, various free entertainment acts/events, a very large midway, plus twice-daily "big name" musical concert performances.

History 
The idea of the strawberry festival was conceived of by the Plant City Lions Club in 1930, after several attempts made by locals to promote the local strawberry crop. The first Florida Strawberry Festival was held in the same year.  The festival occurred annually for 11 years until World War II halted operations from 1941 to 1947. The American Legion, Post #26, helped get the festival reactivated in 1948.

See also 
 Florida food festivals
 List of strawberry topics

References

External links 
 

Festivals in Florida
Food and drink festivals in the United States
Tourist attractions in Hillsborough County, Florida
Strawberry festivals
1930 establishments in Florida
Festivals established in 1930
Plant City, Florida
Annual events in Florida